Alex was a French restaurant located in Las Vegas, Nevada that held two Michelin stars. It is the namesake restaurant of celebrity chef Alessandro Stratta, Iron Chef USA and winner of the James Beard Foundation Award for "Best Chef Southwest" in 1998. The restaurant was well known for Stratta's unique approach and attention to molecular gastronomy. The restaurant was considered one of the finest in the United States. It closed indefinitely on January 15, 2011.
The food was French with an Italian influence and was offered via a prix fixe menu only.

Awards and honors
5 stars, 2006-2010 Mobil Travel Guide
5 diamonds, 2006-2010 AAA Restaurant Ratings
2 stars, 2007, 2008, and 2009 Michelin Guide

See also
Alessandro Stratta
 List of restaurants in the Las Vegas Valley
Wynn Las Vegas

References

External links
 The New York Times
 Mobil Travel Guide
 Epicurious
 Esquire magazine
 Las Vegas Review-Journal

Restaurants in the Las Vegas Valley
Michelin Guide starred restaurants in Nevada
French restaurants in Nevada
Molecular gastronomy
Defunct French restaurants in the United States